Ullastret is a small historic village on the Bay of Empordà located some 5 km northeast of La Bisbal d'Empordà, in Catalonia.

In prehistoric times the village was probably on an island in the former 3 km2 lake, known as Llac d'Ullastret or Estany d'Ullastret, connected by a causway, but the lake dried up in the 19th century.

It is home to ancient Iberian archaeological remains, in particular much of the thick walls around the village are ancient. There is a medieval church known from the 9th century, dedicated to SS. Paul and Peter. The economy is based mostly on tourism and agriculture.

Gallery

See also

 Indigetes

References

External links
 Government data pages 

Municipalities in Baix Empordà
Populated places in Baix Empordà